Tumaraa is a commune of French Polynesia, an overseas territory of France in the Pacific Ocean. The commune of Tumaraa is located on the island of Raiatea, in the administrative subdivision of the Leeward Islands, themselves part of the Society Islands. At the 2017 census it had a population of 3,721, making it the least populous commune on Raiatea.

Tumaraa consists of the following associated communes:
 Fetuna
 Tehurui
 Tevaitoa
 Vaiaau

The administrative centre of the commune is the settlement of Tevaitoa. The tallest mountain on Raiatea - Mont Temehani - is located within Tumaraa.

References

Communes of French Polynesia